Alexios Aristenos was oikonomos and nomophylax of the Great Church at Constantinople.  He flourished around 1166 AD, in which year he was present at the Council of Constantinople.  He edited a Synopsis Canonum with scholia, which is given by Bishop Beveridge in his Pandectae Canonum in 1672.  Other works by him are quoted.

References

12th-century Byzantine people
12th-century Byzantine writers
Canon law jurists
Orphanotrophoi
12th-century jurists
Byzantine jurists